Castillo de Teayo may refer to:
 Castillo de Teayo (Mesoamerican site), a pre-Columbian archaeological site and Mesoamerican pyramid, in Veracruz, Mexico
 Castillo de Teayo (municipality), a municipality of Veracruz state, Mexico
 Castillo de Teayo, Veracruz, a modern-day settlement and municipal seat for the municipality of the same name